Mora is a village in the Nicosia District of Cyprus. The village is de facto under the control of Northern Cyprus.
Before the Turkish invasion of Cyprus in 1974 it was inhabited almost exclusively by Turkish Cypriots

References

Communities in Nicosia District
Populated places in Lefkoşa District